25 Magazine was an urban arts, entertainment and culture magazine headquartered in Washington, D.C.

History
In January 2008, the magazine launched online as The Grind Magazine and covered careers, student life, entertainment, social issues and academics but later relaunched and rebranded in August 2008 as 25 Magazine, refocusing its content to cater to a niche audience of young urban professionals in metropolitan cities.

Awards
In September 2009, 25 Magazine was the recipient of the "popular vote" award in the 2009 Black Weblog Awards in the "Best Post Series" category for their "Starving Artists" feature series which at the time featured artists U-N-I, Tanya Morgan, Gangsta L. Crisis, and producer and video blogger, Jabari Johnson.

References

External links
 Official Website

Magazines established in 2008
Magazines published in Washington, D.C.
Online magazines published in the United States
Visual arts magazines published in the United States